Synesthesia is a neurological condition in which two or more bodily senses are coupled. For example, in a form of synesthesia known as Grapheme → color synesthesia, letters or numbers may be perceived as inherently colored. In another, called number → form synesthesia, numbers are automatically and consistently associated with locations in space. In yet another form of synesthesia, called ordinal linguistic personification, either numbers, days of the week, or months of the year evoke personalities. In other forms of synesthesia, music and other sounds may be perceived as colored or having particular shapes. Recent research has begun to explore the neural basis of these experiences, drawing both on neuroscientific principles and on functional neuroimaging data.

Based on these data, two major theories have been proposed concerning the neural basis of synesthesia. Both theories start from the observation that there are dedicated regions of the brain that are specialized for certain functions. For example, the part of the human brain involved in processing visual input, called the visual cortex can be further subdivided into regions that are preferentially involved in color-processing (the fourth visual area, V4) or with motion processing, called V5 or MT. Based on this notion of specialized regions, some researchers have suggested that increased cross-talk between different regions specialized for different functions may account for different types of synesthesia.

Cross-activation

Since regions involved in the identification of letters and numbers lie adjacent to a region involved in color-processing (V4), the additional experience of seeing colors when looking at graphemes might be due to "cross-activation" of V4 . This cross-activation may arise due to a failure of the normal developmental process of pruning, which is one of the key mechanisms of synaptic plasticity, in which connections between brain regions are partially eliminated with development. Similarly, lexical → gustatory synesthesia may be due to increased connectivity between adject regions of the insula in the depths of the lateral sulcus involved in taste processing that lie adjacent to temporal lobe regions involved in auditory processing. Similarly, taste → touch synesthesia may arise from connections between gustatory regions and regions of the somatosensory system involved in processing touch. However, not all forms of synesthesia are easily explained by adjacency.

Disinhibited feedback
Alternatively, synesthesia may arise through "disinhibited feedback" or a reduction in the amount of inhibition along feedback pathways . It is well established that information not only travels from the primary sensory areas to association areas such as the parietal lobe or the limbic system, but also travels back in the opposite direction, from "higher order" cortical regions to early sensory areas. Normally, the balance of excitation and inhibition are maintained. However, if this feedback were not adequately inhibited, then signals coming from later stages of processing might influence earlier stages of processing, such that tones would activate visual cortical areas in synesthetes more than in non-synesthetes. In this case, it might be possible to temporarily have synesthetic experiences after taking drugs like LSD or mescaline. Indeed, some psychedelic drug users report synesthesia-like experiences, although the exact degree of similarity between these drug induced experiences and congenital synesthesia is still unclear .

Semantics
Much evidence indicates that synesthesia is essentially a semantic phenomenon. This suggests a very different theoretical approach to synesthesia, known as ideasthesia. According to this account, synesthesia is a phenomenon mediated by the extraction of the meaning of the inducer. Therefore, the neural mechanisms of synesthesia must rely on the mechanisms of semantics, which are currently poorly understood. In turn, semantics is closely related to the problem of understanding, which Searle illustrates the importance of understanding through the Chinese room argument. Thus, the question of the neural basis of synesthesia may be ultimately related to the neural mechanisms of understanding.

Neurophysiological substrates
Given that synesthesia is known to run in families, it has been suggested that a genetic difference, or single-nucleotide polymorphisms (SNPs, pronounced "SNiPs") might be responsible for either decreased pruning or decreased inhibition in the synesthete brain, leading to increased activation. These theories are not mutually exclusive. It may be that both mechanisms are possible causes of synesthesia, but that one or the other is present in differing degrees between different synesthetes, or for different types of synesthesia.

Functional neuroimaging studies
Functional neuroimaging studies using positron emission tomography (PET) and functional magnetic resonance imaging (fMRI) have demonstrated significant differences between the brains of synesthetes and non-synesthetes (although some studies failed to find such differences). The first such study used PET to demonstrate that some regions of the visual cortex (but not V4) were more active when auditory word → color synesthetes listened to words compared to tones . More recent studies using fMRI have demonstrated that V4 is more active in both word → color and grapheme → color synesthetes. However, these neuroimaging studies do not have the spatial and temporal resolution to distinguish between the pruning and disinhibited feedback theories. Future research will continue to examine these questions using not only fMRI but also diffusion tensor imaging (DTI), which allows researchers to directly investigate neural connectivity in the human brain and magnetic resonance spectroscopy (MRS) which allows researchers to measure the amounts of different neurotransmitters in the brain.

See also
Ideasthesia

References

Synesthesia